Compositional Sketches for the Virgin Adoring the Christ Child, with and without the Infant St. John the Baptist; Diagram of a Perspectival Projection (recto); Slight Doodles (verso) is a 1480s drawing by Leonardo da Vinci. It is in the collection of the Metropolitan Museum of Art.

Creation 
Da Vinci used a traditional fifteenth-century medium of metalpoint to make the sketch; however, he reinforced the shadows of the drawings with pen and ink for a deeper tonal range.

Description and interpretation 
The sketches depicts the Virgin Mary kneeling before a baby Jesus. As well as baby Jesus alone and  perspective experiments.

These sketches contain thematic similarities to his later painting, the Virgin of the Rocks.

References 

Drawings of the Metropolitan Museum of Art
Drawings by Leonardo da Vinci